Renegades: Born in the USA is a 2021 podcast series hosted by former U.S. president Barack Obama and singer-songwriter Bruce Springsteen.

Episodes

Production

Springsteen and Obama became friends on the campaign trail for Obama's 2008 United States presidential election campaign. Dan Fierman, the head of Higher Ground Audio, said that Michelle Obama experience producing The Michelle Obama Podcast influenced Barack's decision to launch a podcast. In 2019, the Obama's production company, Higher Ground Productions, signed an exclusive podcast deal with Spotify. Comcast and Dollar Shave Club sponsored the series.

The first recording session took place on July 30, 2020. The podcast was recorded at Springsteen's home in Colts Neck Township, New Jersey.

Reception
James Marriot for The Times rated the series four out of five stars. Slate Jody Rosen criticised the series, writing that the series "promises difficult conversations about race, but it avoids the actual difficulties". Jon Garelick, writing on NBC News, criticised Obama and Springsteen for partnering with Spotify. David Klion described the podcast as "bland" and "boring" in his review for The New Republic.

Book 
In October 2021 a book was published based on this podcast.

References

External links
 Official transcripts

2021 podcast debuts
2021 podcast endings
American podcasts
Barack Obama
Bruce Springsteen
Higher Ground Productions